São Tomé and Príncipe competed at the 2014 Summer Youth Olympics, in Nanjing, China from 16 August to 28 August 2014.

Athletics

São Tomé and Príncipe qualified one athlete.

Qualification Legend: Q=Final A (medal); qB=Final B (non-medal); qC=Final C (non-medal); qD=Final D (non-medal); qE=Final E (non-medal)

Girls
Track & road events

Beach Volleyball

São Tomé and Príncipe was given a team to compete from the tripartite committee.

Canoeing

São Tomé and Príncipe was given a boat to compete by the tripartite committee.

Girls

References

2014 in São Tomé and Príncipe
Nations at the 2014 Summer Youth Olympics
São Tomé and Príncipe at the Youth Olympics